The Bhimber District is the southernmost district of the 10 districts of Pakistan's dependent territory of Azad Kashmir. It has an area of 1516 km², and the district headquarter is the town of Bhimber.

History
The area is rich in archeological remains due to its strategic location on the route that was followed by the Mughal emperors on their frequent visits to the Kashmir Valley.

It is strategically important from defense and military standpoint. Due to its location, it became known as the Gateway to Kashmir (Bab-e-Kashmir).

Previously, Bhimber was a tehsil of the Mirpur District but was elevated to district status in 1996.

Location

The Bhimber District is bounded on the north by the Kotli District, on the east by the Rajouri District and the Jammu District of Indian-administered Jammu and Kashmir, on the south by the Gujrat District of Pakistan's Punjab Province, and on the west by the Mirpur District.  The town of Bhimber is 50 km from the city of Mirpur.

Administrative divisions

The Bhimber District is subdivided into three tehsils:

 Barnala Tehsil
 Bhimber Tehsil
 Samahni Tehsil

Demography
According to the 2017 census, the population of the district is 420,624.

The main native languages are Punjabi (according to a rough estimate, spoken by 35% of the population), Pahari-Pothwari (30%), Dogri (30%) and Gujari (5%). Urdu has official status.

Education 

According to the Alif Ailaan Pakistan District Education Rankings 2015, the Bhimber District ranked 10th out of 145 districts in Pakistan and its two dependent territories in terms of education. For facilities and infrastructure, the district ranked 116 out of 145.

Climate

The southern zone of the Mirpur Division has a climate similar to the neighbouring areas of the Punjab province.  Hot summer temperatures are often over 45 C from May to September. Winters are cold, and rainfall is concentrated in the monsoon season from late June to the end of August.  There is often a prolonged dry period from October to early January, followed by winter rains from mid-January to March.

Notes

References

External links
Bhimber Azad Kashmir Public website
Bhimber district page by the Government of Azad Kashmir

 
Districts of Azad Kashmir